Maurice B. Brennan (April 6, 1842August 7, 1927) was an Irish American immigrant, politician and farmer.

Born in County Kerry, Ireland, Brennan emigrated with his parents to the United States in 1848, initially settling in Springfield, Massachusetts. In 1852, Brennan and his family settled in the town of Morrison, Brown County, Wisconsin. Brennan was a livestock dealer and farmer. Brennan served as assessor of the town of Morrison. In 1881 and 1905, Brennan served in the Wisconsin State Assembly as a Republican. Brennan died at the home of his daughter in Cato, Manitowoc County, Wisconsin, where he had been living.

Notes

1842 births
1927 deaths
Irish emigrants to the United States (before 1923)
People from Morrison, Wisconsin
People from Cato, Wisconsin
Farmers from Wisconsin
Republican Party members of the Wisconsin State Assembly